The 2020–21 PFC CSKA Moscow season was the club's 110th season in existence and the 29th consecutive season in the top flight of Russian football. In addition to the domestic league, CSKA Moscow participates in this season's editions of the Russian Cup and UEFA Europa League. The season covers the period from August 2020 to 30 June 2021. CSKA Moscow finished the season in 6th place, were knocked out of the Russian Cup by Lokomotiv Moscow in the Semifinals, and finished 4th in their UEFA Europa League group.

Season events

Summer Transfers
On 20 July, Vitali Zhironkin returned to Baltika Kaliningrad on loan for the 2020–21 season.

On 31 July, Maksim Yeleyev signed a new contract with CSKA Moscow, until the summer of 2024, and moved to Akron Tolyatti on a season-long loan deal. Also on 31 July, Khetag Khosonov left CSKA to move permanently to Alania Vladikavkaz.

On 5 August, Cédric Gogoua joined Rotor Volgograd on a season-long loan deal, with the option to make the move permanent, whilst Ilya Pomazun extended his CSKA contract until the end of the 2024–25 season, and moved to Ural Yekaterinburg on loan for the season. Later the same day, CSKA announced the signing of Adolfo Gaich to a five-year contract, from San Lorenzo.

On 7 August, CSKA agreed a new one-year contract with Kirill Nababkin after his previous contract had expired at the end of the previous season.

On 11 August, Lassana N'Diaye joined Swedish Superettan club AFC Eskilstuna on loan for the remainder of 2020.

On 12 August, Timur Zhamaletdinov was sold to FC Ufa.

On 20 August, Gocha Gogrichiani moved to Akron Tolyatti on loan for the season.

On 25 August, CSKA announced the signing of Baktiyar Zaynutdinov from Rostov on a five-year contract, and Bruno Fuchs from Internacional also on a five-year contract.

On 28 August, CSKA announced the signing of Chidera Ejuke from SC Heerenveen on a four-year contract.

August
CSKA opened the season with an away trip to newly promoted FC Khimki, which they won 2-0 thanks to first half goals from Konstantin Kuchayev and Alan Dzagoev. In CSKA's second game of the season, they defeated Tambov 2–1, with Kuchayev scoring his second goal of the season and Ilya Shkurin scoring his first for the club.

On 19 August, CSKA faced Zenit St.Petersburg in the first 'El-Clasikov' of the season. CSKA lost the match 2–1 to Zenit, with Vlašić scoring CSKA's only goal.

On 22 August, CSKA hosted Rubin Kazan at the VEB Arena, losing 2–1 to a later winner scored by Denis Makarov, after Nikola Vlašić had cancelled out Soltmurad Bakayev's opener.

On 26 August, CSKA traveled to Krasnodar, drawing 1-1 after Wanderson cancelled out Konstantin Kuchayev's third goal of the season.

On 30 August, CSKA faced Akhmat Grozny at the Akhmat-Arena in Grozny, where a first half goal from Konstantin Kuchayev and two late second-half goals from Kristijan Bistrović and Nikola Vlašić, saw CSKA turn out 3-0 winners.

September
On 11 September, Nair Tiknizyan signed a new contract with CSKA, until the end of the 2024–25 season.

On 13 September, CSKA hosted Spartak Moscow in the first Moscow derby of the season at the VEB Arena. Spartak opened the scoring in the 11th minute through Ezequiel Ponce, before Hörður Magnússon and Nikola Vlašić scored before half-time to give CSKA the lead. In injury time at the end of the match Chidera Ejuke scored his first goal for CSKA and to seal a 3–1 victory.

On 18 September, Jaka Bijol was loaned to Hannover 96 for one-season.

On 20 September, CSKA travelled to Ufa, where a 65th-minute goal from Kristijan Bistrović secured the win for CSKA.

On 27 September, CSKA hosted Lokomotiv Moscow in the second Moscow derby of the season. Fyodor Smolov scored the only goal of the game, whilst Kristijan Bistrović was sent off for two bookable offence with the game ending 1–0 to Lokomotiv.

October
CSKA started October by being drawn into a Europa League group with Wolfsberger AC, Dinamo Zagreb and Feyenoord on 2 October. The following day, 3 October, CSKA played Ural Yekaterinburg at the Central Stadium in Yekaterinburg and ran out 2-0 winners. After Hörður Magnússon was shown a red card early in the second half, goals from Baktiyar Zaynutdinov and Konstantin Maradishvili gave CSKA the win.

Following the international break, CSKA host Dynamo Moscow at the VEB Arena on 18 October. After an early Fyodor Chalov goal was ruled out, Konstantin Kuchayev scored his fifth goal of the season to give CSKA the lead in the 51st minute. Chidera Ejuke doubled CSKA's lead three minutes later, before Nikola Moro made it three goals in six minutes to make it 2–1. Igor Diveyev scored CSKA's third goal of the game before Roman Yevgenyev was sent off for a second booking, with the game ending 3–1 to CSKA.

CSKA traveled to Austria on 22 October to face Wolfsberger AC in the first group match of their UEFA Europa League campaign. Adolfo Gaich opened the scoring with his first goal for the club in fifth minute, before a forty-second-minute penalty from Michael Liendl, after a Viktor Vasin foul, levelled the scoring. With neither side finding the net in the second half, the game finished 1-1.

On 26 October, CSKA hosted Arsenal Tula at the VEB Arena, with Fyodor Chalov opening the scoring in stoppage time at the end of the first half from the penalty spot. In the second, CSKA continued their scoring with Nikola Vlašić scoring a brace before Luka Đorđević pulled one back for Arsenal Tula and Arnór Sigurðsson and Ivan Oblyakov rounded off the scoring to see CSKA run out 5-1 winner. Three days later, 29 October, CSKA played out a 0–0 draw with Dinamo Zagreb at the VEB Arena in the second game day of the UEFA Europa League.

November
CSKA travelled to Rotor Volgograd on 1 November, winning 1-0 thanks to a first-half goal from Alan Dzagoev.

On 4 November, CSKA extended their contract with Vadim Karpov until the summer of 2025. The following day, 5 November, CSKA faced Feyenoord at De Kuip in their third UEFA Europa League match. Feyenoord won the match 3–1, with CSKA's consolation goal coming from a Marcos Senesi own goal in the 80th minute, leaving CSKA at the bottom of Group K on 2 points at the half was point of the Group Stages.

On 8 November, CSKA hosted Rostov at the VEB Arena, winning 2–0 with a goal in each half. Konstantin Kuchayev scored his sixth of the season with a deflected shot past Sergei Pesyakov, before Roman Eremenko missed a penalty for Rostov, and Fyodor Chalov sealed the victory for CSKA in the 74th minute.

On 20 November, CSKA extended their contract with Fyodor Chalov until the summer of 2024.

On 22 November, CSKA hosted Sochi at the VEB Arena in the 15th round of the Russian Premier League. The match ended 1-1, with Arnór Sigurðsson giving CSKA the lead in the 5th minute and Nikita Burmistrov equalising for Sochi in the 23rd minute. Four days later, CSKA drew 0–0 at home to Feyenoord in the Europa League. CSKA suffered their first league defeat in six games on 29 November, losing 1–0 to Rubin Kazan at the Ak Bars Arena.

December
CSKA were knocked out of the UEFA Europa League with one group remaining on 3 December, after suffering a 1–0 home defeat to Wolfsberger AC. The following day, 4 December, Kristijan Bistrović extended his contract with CSKA until the summer of 2025.

On 6 December, CSKA hosted Khimki at the VEB Arena. After Nikola Vlašić initially gave CSKA the lead in the first half, Khimki scored twice within 5 minutes through Ilya Kukharchuk and Reziuan Mirzov at the start of the second half before Ilya Shkurin rounded off the scoring with an equaliser for CSKA in the 54th minute.

On 10 December, CSKA traveled to Zagreb to face Dinamo Zagreb in their last Europa League group match, losing 3–1 with Kristijan Bistrović scoring CSKA's consolation goal. Three days later, 13 December, CSKA hosted Ural Yekaterinburg at the VEB Arena. Ilya Shkurin gave CSKA the lead in the 12th minute before Andrei Yegorychev equalised in the 31st minute to end the first half 1-1. In the second half, Pavel Pogrebnyak was sent off for two yellow cards in quick succession before Nikola Vlašić restored CSKA's lead from the penalty spot in the 61st minute. Ihor Kalinin scored a 90th-minute equaliser for Ural, before Shkurin received a straight red card for a challenge and the game ending 2-2 and extending CSKA's win-less streak to 7 games.

On 17 December, CSKA travelled to the Rostov Arena to face Rostov in their last game of 2020. A hat-trick from Fyodor Chalov secured all three points for CSKA, with Aleksei Kozlov scoring a consolation goal for Rostov.

January
On 13 January, Vitali Zhironkin returned to CSKA after his loan deal to Baltika Kaliningrad was ended early.

On 21 January, CSKA Moscow signed defender Aleksei Sukharev from Avangard Kursk after he'd previously spent time on loan at CSKA during the 2019–20 season. The following day, 22 January, Kristijan Bistrović moved to Kasımpaşa on loan for the remainder of the season, with an option for the transfer to be made permanent.

On 30 January, Adolfo Gaich joined Benevento on loan for the remainder of the season.

February
On 1 February, Vitali Zhironkin joined KAMAZ on loan for the remainder of the season.

On 11 February, Takuma Nishimura joined Vegalta Sendai permanently having been on loan at the club for the previous season.

On 15 February, CSKA announced the signing of Emil Bohinen from Stabæk on a contract until the end of the 2024/25 season, and the loan signing of Salomón Rondón from Dalian Professional.

On 18 February, Mário Fernandes extended his contract with CSKA until the summer of 2024.

On 20 February, Tigran Avanesyan joined Tambov on loan for the remainder of the season.

On 21 February, CSKA hosted SKA-Khabarovsk in the Last 16 round of the Russian Cup. A first half goal from Ilzat Akhmetov and a second half goal from Nikola Vlašić gave CSKA a 2–0 victory over the FNL side.

On 22 February, Maksim Yeleyev joined Yenisey Krasnoyarsk on loan for the remainder of the season.

On 25 February, transfer deadline day, Lassana N'Diaye joined Veles Moscow on loan for the remainder of the season, and Nikita Kotin joined Irtysh Omsk on a similar deal, whilst Ilya Pomazun had returned early from his loan to Ural Yekaterinburg.

On 27 February, CSKA faced Lokomotiv Moscow in their first Russian Premier League game after the winter break. First half goals from Vitaly Lisakovich and Grzegorz Krychowiak secured the win for Lokomotiv.

March
On 6 March, CSKA hosted Akhmat Grozny at the VEB Arena, winning 2-0 after goals from Salomón Rondón and Nikola Vlašić.

On 13 March, CSKA faced Arsenal Tula at the Arsenal Stadium, losing 2–1. Arsenal took a 2-0 half time lead through goal from Vladislav Panteleyev and Aleksandr Lomovitsky, before Nair Tiknizyan scored a late conciliation goal and Aleksandr Dovbnya and Valeriy Gromyko were sent off.

On 17 March, CSKA hosted Zenit St.Petersburg at the VEB Arena, losing 3–2. CSKA took the lead through former Zenit striker Salomón Rondón in the 28th minute, with Artem Dzyuba equalising in the 33rd minute before missing a penalty in the 45th minute. In the second half Wendel scored twice, with Ilzat Akhmetov being sent-off for CSKA in between the two goals, before Nikola Vlašić scored a stoppage time penalty to end the match 3–2.

On 22 March, Viktor Goncharenko left his role as Head Coach of CSKA Moscow by mutual consent. The following day, 23 March, CSKA announced Ivica Olić as their new Head Coach.

April
On 4 April, new Head Coach, Ivica Olić, took charge of his first game for CSKA, away to Tambov. After Artyom Arkhipov game Tambov the lead from the penalty spot in the 16th minute, Nikola Vlašić equalised from the penalty spot 10 minutes later before Salomón Rondón also scored from the spot in the 52nd minute. Vlašić would later miss another penalty in the 64th minute, with the match ending 2–1 to CSKA. 4 days later, 8 April, CSKA played Arsenal Tula at the Arsenal Stadium in the Russian Cup. After falling behind to a Yevgeni Lutsenko first-half goal, Vadim Karpov equalised early in the second half, before Lutsenko was then sent-off and Mário Fernandes sealed the win in the 86th minute, to send CSKA through to the Semifinal of the Cup. CSKA hosted Rotor Volgograd on 12 April at the VEB Arena. After Chidera Ejuke gave CSKA the lead just before half-time, Salomón Rondón doubled CSKA's lead in the 70th minute to earn CSKA a 2–0 victory over Rotor to leave them fourth in the table. On 18 April, CSKA traveled to Sochi to face PFC Sochi, where Igor Diveyev's second half goal wasn't enough to prevent Sochi winning 2–1, leaving CSKA 5th in the table.

On 21 April, CSKA faced Lokomotiv Moscow in the semifinal of the Russian Cup at the RZD Arena. François Kamano gave Lokomotiv the lead in the 16th minute, after Salomón Rondón had earlier had a goal ruled out. Fyodor Smolov extended Lokomotiv's lead early in the second half before Grzegorz Krychowiak sealed the victory for Lokomotiv in injury time, and knock CSKA out of the Cup. On 25 April, CSKA lost their third game in a row under Ivica Olić, losing 1–0 to Spartak Moscow at the Otkritie Arena after Ilzat Akhmetov was sentoff in the first half and Jordan Larsson scored the only goal of the game in the second half, leaving CSKA 6th in the table.

May
On 1 May, CSKA hosted Ufa at the VEB Arena. Filip Mrzljak gave Ufa the lead in the 66th minute before Fyodor Chalov equalised 5 minutes later for CSKA to end the game 1-1.

On 8 May, CSKA hosted Krasnodar in their last home game of the season. Viktor Claesson gave Krasnodar the lead in the 26th minute, with Chidera Ejuke equalising six minutes later. Fyodor Chalov gave CSKA the lead in the 56th minute before Mário Fernandes finished off the scoring in the 69th minute to give CSKA a 3–1 victory and leaving them in 6th position going in to the last game of the season, 2 points off the European places.

On 16 May, CSKA ended their season with a 3–2 away defeat to Dynamo Moscow, which left them finishing sixth in the league. Nair Tiknizyan gave CSKA the lead in the first half, before two goals from Vyacheslav Grulyov gave Dynamo Moscow the lead. Chidera Ejuke equalised for CSKA in the 79th minute before Arsen Zakharyan won it for Dynamo in the 89th minute.

Squad

Out on loan

Transfers

In

Loans in

Out

Loans out

Released

Trial

Friendlies

Competitions

Overview

Premier League

League table

Results summary

Results by round

Results

Russian Cup

UEFA Europa League

Group stage

Squad statistics

Appearances and goals

|-
|colspan="14"|Players away from the club on loan:

|-
|colspan="14"|Players who left CSKA Moscow during the season:
|}

Goal scorers

Clean sheets

Disciplinary record

References

PFC CSKA Moscow seasons
CSKA Moscow
CSKA Moscow